John Anthony Lee (born 26 November 1947) is an English former footballer who played on the right wing in the Football League for Bradford City and Darlington. He played for Stockton as a youngster, was on the books of Leicester City and Hartlepool United without appearing in the league for either, and also played non-league football for Stockton, South Shields, and Goole Town.

After his playing career ended, he went into management at the non-league level, with clubs including Whitby Town, Billingham Synthonia, Gateshead (two spells), South Bank, Bishop Auckland (two spells), Spennymoor United (three spells), Newcastle Blue Star, Celtic Nation, and Billingham Town.

He also acted as a scout for Darlington when his son Graeme Lee, himself a former league footballer, was their manager.

Tony passed away on 12th February 2023 after a long battle with illness.

References

1947 births
Living people
Footballers from Middlesbrough
English footballers
Association football wingers
Stockton F.C. players
Leicester City F.C. players
Bradford City A.F.C. players
Darlington F.C. players
South Shields F.C. (1936) players
Hartlepool United F.C. players
Goole Town F.C. players
English Football League players
English football managers
Whitby Town F.C. managers
Billingham Synthonia F.C. managers
Gateshead F.C. managers
Bishop Auckland F.C. managers
Spennymoor United F.C. managers
Newcastle Blue Star F.C. managers
Celtic Nation F.C. managers
Billingham Town F.C. managers